SS Benalbanach was the name of two ships operated by the Ben Line.
 , sunk off Algiers in 1943 with the loss of 410 lives.
 , ex-Empire Athelstan, served with Ben Line from 1947–63. Scrapped in 1975.

References

Ship names